James Henry Lloyd (1825–1898) was a convict transported to Western Australia, who later became one of the colony's ex-convict school teachers.

Born in Ireland in 1825, nothing is known of his early life.  In 1850 he was convicted of stealing a cow, and sentenced to ten years' penal labour.  Lloyd was transported to Western Australia on board the Robert Small, which arrived in August 1853.  After receiving his ticket of leave, in December 1858 he married Johanna Enright, three of whose brothers were transported on the same ship as Lloyd.  In 1866, Lloyd was appointed government schoolmaster at Northam.  He taught there until 1887.  During that time he became a respected member of the Northam community, serving a secretary of the Northam Road Board and the Northam Municipal Council, and as registrar of births, deaths and marriages until 1896.  He died in 1898.

References
 

1825 births
1898 deaths
Convicts transported to Western Australia
Settlers of Western Australia
Australian schoolteachers